Chris Jensen Burke was the first New Zealand or Australian woman to reach the summit of K2. Since climbing Mount Everest on 20 May 2011, Burke has climbed nine other eight-thousander peaks, including K2 on 26 July 2014 and Kanchenjunga on 17 May 2018.  She is also the first New Zealand or Australian woman to climb the highest mountains on each of the seven continents (Carstensz list) in an endeavour known as the Seven Summits.

Climbing career

Burke commenced the Seven Summits endeavor by successfully reaching the summit of Mount Kilimanjaro on 6 August 2010, and completed the last of the Seven Summits (in the 'Bass' list) with her successful climb of Mount Elbrus in Russia on 25 July 2012.  She completed the 'Messner' list on 15 January 2013, on successful completion of her Carstensz Pyramid climb.

She reached the summit of Mount Everest on 20 May 2011.

Eight-thousanders

 2011
 Mt Everest
 2013
 Lhotse
 Gasherbrum 2
 Gasherbrum 1
 Manaslu
 2014
 Makalu
 K2
 Cho-Oyu
 2016
 Annapurna
 2018
 Kanchenjunga

Personal life
Burke has engaged in numerous private charitable initiatives in Nepal, including fundraising for and supporting disadvantaged and trafficked women and girls.

She lives in Australia.

References

External links 
 Christine Burke interviewed by Radio New Zealand
 Official website

Living people
Summiters of the Seven Summits
Australian mountain climbers
New Zealand mountain climbers
Australian summiters of Mount Everest
Female climbers
1968 births